Evergestis umbrosalis is a species of moth in the family Crambidae. It is found in Spain, Turkey, Greece, Ukraine and European Russia.

The wingspan is 30–33 mm. In Turkey, adults have been recorded on wing at the beginning of May. In the Sierra Nevada they have been recorded at the beginning of July.

References

Moths described in 1842
Evergestis
Moths of Europe
Moths of Asia
Taxa named by Josef Emanuel Fischer von Röslerstamm